The People's Party, also known as the Populist Party or simply the Populists, was a left-wing agrarian populist political party in the United States in the late 19th century. The Populist Party emerged in the early 1890s as an important force in the Southern and Western United States, but collapsed after it nominated Democrat William Jennings Bryan in the 1896 United States presidential election. A rump faction of the party continued to operate into the first decade of the 20th century, but never matched the popularity of the party in the early 1890s.

The Populist Party's roots lay in the Farmers' Alliance, an agrarian movement that promoted economic action during the Gilded Age, as well as the Greenback Party, an earlier third party that had advocated fiat money. The success of Farmers' Alliance candidates in the 1890 elections, along with the conservatism of both major parties, encouraged Farmers' Alliance leaders to establish a full-fledged third party before the 1892 elections. The Ocala Demands laid out the Populist platform: collective bargaining, federal regulation of railroad rates, an expansionary monetary policy, and a Sub-Treasury Plan that required the establishment of federally controlled warehouses to aid farmers. Other Populist-endorsed measures included bimetallism, a graduated income tax, direct election of Senators, a shorter workweek, and the establishment of a postal savings system. These measures were collectively designed to curb the influence of monopolistic corporate and financial interests and empower small businesses, farmers and laborers.

In the 1892 presidential election, the Populist ticket of James B. Weaver and James G. Field won 8.5% of the popular vote and carried four Western states, becoming the first third party since the end of the American Civil War to win electoral votes. Despite the support of labor organizers like Eugene V. Debs and Terence V. Powderly, the party largely failed to win the vote of urban laborers in the Midwest and the Northeast. Over the next four years, the party continued to run state and federal candidates, building up powerful organizations in several Southern and Western states. Before the 1896 presidential election, the Populists became increasingly polarized between "fusionists," who wanted to nominate a joint presidential ticket with the Democratic Party, and "mid-roaders," like Mary Elizabeth Lease, who favored the continuation of the Populists as an independent third party. After the 1896 Democratic National Convention nominated William Jennings Bryan, a prominent bimetallist, the Populists also nominated Bryan but rejected the Democratic vice-presidential nominee in favor of party leader Thomas E. Watson. In the 1896 election, Bryan swept the South and West but lost to Republican William McKinley by a decisive margin.

After the 1896 presidential election, the Populist Party suffered a nationwide collapse. The party nominated presidential candidates in the three presidential elections after 1896, but none came close to matching Weaver's performance in 1892. Former Populists became inactive or joined other parties. Other than Debs and Bryan, few politicians associated with the Populists retained national prominence.

Historians see the Populists as a reaction to the power of corporate interests in the Gilded Age, but they debate the degree to which the Populists were anti-modern and nativist. Scholars also continue to debate the magnitude of influence the Populists exerted on later organizations and movements, such as the progressives of the early 20th century. Most of the Progressives, such as Theodore Roosevelt, Robert La Follette, and Woodrow Wilson, were bitter enemies of the Populists. In American political rhetoric, "populist" was originally associated with the Populist Party and related to left-wing movements, but beginning in the 1950s it began to take on a more generic meaning, describing any anti-establishment movement regardless of its position on the left–right political spectrum.

Origins

Third party antecedents 

Ideologically, the Populist Party originated in the debate over monetary policy in the aftermath of the American Civil War. In order to fund that war, the U.S. government had left the gold standard by issuing fiat paper currency known as Greenbacks. After the war, the Eastern financial establishment strongly favored a return to the gold standard for both ideological reasons (they believed that money must be backed by gold which, they argued, had intrinsic value) and economic gain (a return to the gold standard would make their government bonds more valuable). Successive presidential administrations favored "hard money" policies that retired the greenbacks, thereby shrinking the amount of currency in circulation. Financial interests also won passage of the Coinage Act of 1873, which barred the coinage of silver, thereby ending a policy of bimetallism. The deflation caused by these policies affected farmers especially strongly, since deflation made it more difficult to pay debts and led to lower prices for agricultural products.

Angered by these developments, some farmers and other groups began calling for the government to permanently adopt fiat currency. These advocates of "soft money" were influenced by economist Edward Kellogg and Alexander Campbell, both of whom advocated for fiat money issued by a central bank. Despite fierce partisan rivalries, the two major parties were both closely allied with business interests and supported largely similar economic policies, including the gold standard. The Democratic Party's 1868 platform endorsed the continued use of greenbacks, but the party embraced hard money policies after the 1868 election.

Though soft money forces were able to win some support in the West, launching a third party proved difficult in the rest of the country. The United States was deeply polarized by the sectional politics of the post-Civil War era; most Northerners remained firmly attached to the Republican Party, while most Southerners identified with the Democratic Party. In the 1870s advocates of soft money formed the Greenback Party, which called for the continued use of paper money as well as the restoration of bimetallism. Greenback nominee James B. Weaver won over three percent of the vote in the 1880 presidential election, but the Greenback Party was unable to build a durable base of support, and it collapsed in the 1880s. Many former Greenback Party supporters joined the Union Labor Party, but it also failed to win widespread support.

Farmer's Alliance 

A group of farmers formed the Farmers' Alliance in Lampasas, Texas in 1877, and the organization quickly spread to surrounding counties. The Farmers' Alliance promoted collective economic action by farmers in order to cope with the crop-lien system, which left economic power in the hands of a mercantile elite that furnished goods on credit. The movement became increasingly popular throughout Texas in the mid-1880s, and membership in the organization grew from 10,000 in 1884 to 50,000 at the end of 1885. At the same time, the Farmer's Alliance became increasingly politicized, with members attacking the "money trust" as the source and beneficiary of both the crop lien system and deflation. In the hopes of cementing an alliance with labor groups, the Farmer's Alliance supported the Knights of Labor in the Great Southwest railroad strike of 1886. That same year, a Farmer's Alliance convention issued the Cleburne Demands, a series of resolutions that called for, among other things, collective bargaining, federal regulation of railroad rates, an expansionary monetary policy, and a national banking system administered by the federal government.

President Grover Cleveland's veto of a Texas seed bill in early 1887 outraged many farmers, encouraging the growth of a northern Farmer's Alliance in states like Kansas and Nebraska. That same year, a prolonged drought began in the West, contributing to the bankruptcy of many farmers. In 1887, the Farmer's Alliance merged with the Louisiana Farmers Union and expanded into the South and the Great Plains. In 1889, Charles Macune launched the National Economist, which became the national paper of the Farmer's Alliance.

Macune and other Farmer's Alliance leaders helped organize a December 1889 convention in St. Louis; the convention met with the goal of forming a confederation of the major farm and labor organizations. Though a full merger was not achieved, the Farmer's Alliance and the Knights of Labor jointly endorsed the St. Louis Platform, which included many of the long-standing demands of the Farmer's Alliance. The Platform added a call for Macune's "Sub-Treasury Plan," under which the federal government would establish warehouses in agricultural counties; farmers would be allowed to store their crops in these warehouses and borrow up to 80 percent of the value of their crops. The movement began to expand into the Northeast and the Great Lakes region, while Macune led the establishment of the National Reform Press Association, a network of newspapers sympathetic to the Farmer's Alliance.

Formation 

The Farmer's Alliance had initially sought to work within the two-party system, but by 1891 many party leaders had become convinced of the need for a third party that could challenge the conservatism of both major parties. In the 1890 elections, Farmer's Alliance-backed candidates won dozens of races for the U.S. House of Representatives and gained majorities in several state legislatures. Many of these individuals were elected in coalition with Democrats; in Nebraska, the Farmer's Alliance forged an alliance with newly elected Congressman William Jennings Bryan, while in Tennessee, local Farmer's Alliance leader John P. Buchanan was elected governor on the Democratic ticket. As most leading Democrats refused to endorse the Sub-Treasury, many leaders of the Farmer's Alliance remained dissatisfied with both major parties.

In December 1890, a Farmer's Alliance convention re-stated the organization's platform with the Ocala Demands; Farmer's Alliance leaders also agreed to hold another convention in early 1892 to discuss the possibility of establishing a third party if Democrats failed to adopt their policy goals. Among those who favored the establishment of a third party were Farmer's Alliance president Leonidas L. Polk, Georgia newspaper editor Thomas E. Watson, and former Congressman Ignatius L. Donnelly of Minnesota.

The February 1892 Farmer's Alliance convention was attended by supporters of Edward Bellamy and Henry George, as well as current and former members of the Greenback Party, Prohibition Party, Anti-Monopoly Party, Labor Reform Party, Union Labor Party, United Labor Party, Workingmen Party, and dozens of other minor parties. Delivering the final speech of the convention, Ignatius L. Donnelly, stated, "We meet in the midst of a nation brought to the verge of moral, political, and material ruin. ... We seek to restore the government of the republic to the hands of the 'plain people' with whom it originated. Our doors are open to all points of the compass. ... The interests of rural and urban labor are the same; their enemies are identical." Following Donnelly's speech, delegates agreed to establish the People's Party and hold a presidential nominating convention on July 4 in Omaha, Nebraska. Journalists covering the fledgling party began referring to it as the "Populist Party," and that term quickly became widely popular.

1892 election 

The initial front-runner for the Populist Party's presidential nomination was Leonidas Polk, who had served as the chairman of the convention in St. Louis, but he died of an illness weeks before the Populist convention. The party instead turned to former Union General and 1880 Greenback presidential nominee James B. Weaver of Iowa, nominating him on a ticket with former Confederate army officer James G. Field of Virginia. The convention agreed to a party platform known as the Omaha Platform, which proposed the implementation of the Sub-Treasury and other longtime Farmer's Alliance goals. The platform also called for a graduated income tax, direct election of Senators, a shorter workweek, restrictions on immigration to the United States, and public ownership of railroads and communication lines.

The Populists appealed most strongly to voters in the South, the Great Plains, and the Rocky Mountains. In the Rocky Mountains, Populist voters were motivated by support for free silver (bimetallism), opposition to the power of railroads, and clashes with large landowners over water rights. In the South and the Great Plains, Populists had a broad appeal among farmers, but relatively little support in cities and towns. Businessmen and, to a lesser extent, skilled craftsmen were appalled by the perceived radicalism of Populist proposals. Even in rural areas, many voters resisted casting aside their long-standing partisan allegiances. Turner concludes that Populism appealed most strongly to economically distressed farmers who were isolated from urban centers. Linda Slaughter, a prominent women's rights advocate from the Dakota Territory, also participated in the convention, making her the first American woman to vote for a presidential candidate at a national convention.

One of the Populist Party's central goals was to create a coalition between farmers in the South and West and urban laborers in the Midwest and Northeast. In the latter regions, the Populists received the support of union officials like Knights of Labor leader Terrence Powderly and railroad organizer Eugene V. Debs, as well as author Edward Bellamy's Nationalist Clubs. But the Populists lacked compelling campaign planks that appealed specifically to urban laborers, and were largely unable to mobilize support in urban areas. Corporate leaders had largely been successful in preventing labor from organizing politically and economically, and union membership did not rival that of the Farmer's Alliance. Some unions, including the fledgling American Federation of Labor, refused to endorse any political party. Populists were also largely unable to win the support of farmers in the Northeast and the more developed parts of the Midwest.

In the 1892 presidential election, Democratic nominee Grover Cleveland, a strong supporter of the gold standard, defeated incumbent Republican President Benjamin Harrison. Weaver won over one million votes, carried Colorado, Kansas, Idaho, and Nevada, and received electoral votes from Oregon and North Dakota. He was the first third-party candidate since the Civil War to win electoral votes, while Field was first Southern candidate to win electoral votes since the 1872 election. The Populists performed strongly in the West, but many party leaders were disappointed by the results in parts of the South and the entire Great Lakes Region. Weaver failed to win more than 5% of the vote in any state east of the Mississippi River and north of the Mason–Dixon line.

Between presidential elections, 1893–1895 

Shortly after Cleveland took office, the country fell into a deep recession known as the Panic of 1893. In response, Cleveland and his Democratic allies repealed the Sherman Silver Purchase Act and passed the Wilson–Gorman Tariff Act, which provided for a minor reduction in tariff rates. The Populists denounced the Cleveland administration's continued adherence to the gold standard, and they angrily attacked the administration's decision to purchase gold from a syndicate led by J. P. Morgan. Millions fell into unemployment and poverty, and groups like Coxey's Army organized protest marches in Washington, D.C. Party membership grew in several states; historian Lawrence Goodwyn estimates that in the mid-1890s the party had "a following of anywhere from 25 to 45 percent of the electorate in twenty-odd states." Partly due to the growing popularity of the Populist movement, the Democratic Congress included a provision to re-implement a federal income tax in the 1894 Wilson–Gorman Tariff Act.

The Populists faced challenges from both the established major parties and the "Silverites," who generally disregarded the Omaha Platform in favor of bimetallism. These Silverites, who formed groups like the Silver Party and the Silver Republican Party, became particularly strong in Western mining states like Nevada and Colorado. In Colorado, Populists elected Davis Hanson Waite as governor, but the party divided over the Waite's refusal to break the Cripple Creek miners' strike of 1894. Silverites were also strong in Nebraska, where Democratic Congressman William Jennings Bryan continued to enjoy the support of many Nebraska Populists. A coalition of Democrats and Populists elected Populist William V. Allen to the Senate.

The 1894 elections were a massive defeat for the Democratic Party throughout the country, and a mixed result for the Populists. Populists performed poorly in the West and Midwest, where Republicans dominated, but won elections in Alabama and other states. In the aftermath, some party leaders, particularly those outside the South, became convinced of the need to fuse with Democrats and adopt bimetallism as the party's key issue. Party chairman Herman Taubeneck declared that the party should abandon the Omaha Platform and "unite the reform forces of the nation" behind bimetallism. Meanwhile, leading Democrats increasingly distanced themselves from Cleveland's gold standard policies in the aftermath of their performance in the 1894 elections.

The Populists became increasingly polarized between moderate "fusionists" like Taubeneck and radical "mid-roaders" (named for their desire to take a middle road between Democrats and Republicans) like Tom Watson. Fusionists believed the perceived radicalism of the Omaha Platform limited the party's appeal, whereas a platform based on free silver would resonate with a wide array of groups. The mid-roaders believed that free silver did not represent serious economic reform, and continued to call for government ownership of railroads, major changes to the financial system, and resistance to the influence of large corporations. One Texas Populist wrote that free silver would "leave undisturbed all the conditions which give rise to the undue concentration of wealth. The so-called silver party may prove a veritable Trojan Horse if we are not careful." In an attempt to get the party to repudiate the Omaha Platform in favor of free silver, Taubeneck called a party convention in December 1894. Rather than repudiating the Omaha Platform, the convention expanded it to include a call for the municipal ownership of public utilities.

Populist-Republican fusion in North Carolina 

In 1894–1896 the Populist wave of agrarian unrest swept through the cotton and tobacco regions of the South. The most dramatic impact was in North Carolina, where the poor white farmers who comprised the Populist party formed a working coalition with the Republican Party, then largely controlled by blacks in the low country, and poor whites in the mountain districts. They took control of the state legislature in both 1894 and 1896, and the governorship in 1896. Restrictive rules on voting were repealed. In 1895 the legislature rewarded its black allies with patronage, naming 300 black magistrates in eastern districts, as well as deputy sheriffs and city policemen. They also received some federal patronage from the coalition congressman, and state patronage from the governor.

Women and African Americans 

Due to the prevailing racist attitudes of the late 19th century, any political alliance of Southern blacks and Southern whites was difficult to construct, but shared economic concerns allowed some transracial coalition building. After 1886, black farmers started organizing local agricultural groups along the lines the Farmer's Alliance advocated, and in 1888 the national Colored Alliance was established. Some southern Populists, including Watson, openly spoke of the need for poor blacks and poor whites to set aside their racial differences in the name of shared economic interests. The Populists followed the Prohibition Party in actively including women in their affairs. But regardless of these appeals, racism did not evade the People's Party. Prominent Populist Party leaders such as Marion Butler at least partially demonstrated a dedication to the cause of white supremacy, and there appears to have been some support for this viewpoint in the party's rank-and-file membership. After 1900 Watson himself became an outspoken white supremacist.

Conspiratorial tendencies 

Historians continue to debate the degree to which the Populists were bigoted against foreigners and Jews. Members of the anti-Catholic American Protective Association were influential in California's Populist Party organization, and some Populists embraced the anti-Semitic conspiracy theory that the Rothschild family sought to control the United States. Historian Hasia Diner says:

 Some Populists believed that Jews made up a class of international financiers whose policies had ruined small family farms, they asserted, owned the banks and promoted the gold standard, the chief sources of their impoverishment. Agrarian radicalism posited the city as antithetical to American values, asserting that Jews were the essence of urban corruption.

Presidential election of 1896 

In the lead-up to the 1896 presidential election, mid-roaders, fusionists, and free silver Democrats all maneuvered to put their favored candidates in the best position to win. Mid-roaders sought to ensure that the Populists would hold their national convention before that of the Democratic Party, thereby ensuring that they could not be accused of dividing "reform" forces. Defying those hopes, Taubeneck arranged for the 1896 Populist National Convention to take place one week after the 1896 Democratic National Convention. Mid-roaders mobilized to defeat the fusionists; the Southern Mercury urged readers to nominate convention delegates who would "support the Omaha Platform in its entirety." As most of the party's high-ranking officeholders were fusionists, the mid-roaders faced difficulty in uniting around a candidate.

The 1896 Republican National Convention nominated William McKinley, a long-time Republican leader who was best known for leading the passage of 1890 McKinley Tariff. McKinley initially sought to downplay the gold standard in favor of campaigning on higher tariff rates, but he agreed to fully endorse the gold standard at the insistence of Republican donors and party leaders. Meeting later in the year, the 1896 Democratic National Convention nominated William Jennings Bryan for president after Bryan's Cross of Gold speech galvanized the party behind free silver. For vice president, the party nominated conservative shipping magnate Arthur Sewall.

When the Populist convention met, fusionists proposed that the Populists nominate the Democratic ticket, while mid-roaders organized to defeat fusionist efforts. As Sewall was objectionable to many within the party, the mid-roaders successfully moved a motion to nominate the vice president first. Despite a telegram from Bryan indicating that he would not accept the Populist nomination if the party did not also nominate Sewall, the convention chose Tom Watson as the party's vice presidential nominee. The convention also reaffirmed the major planks of the 1892 platform and added support for initiatives and referendums. When the convention's presidential ballot began, it was still unclear whether Bryan would be nominated for president and whether Bryan would accept the nomination if offered. Mid-roaders put forward their own candidate, obscure newspaper editor S. F. Norton, but Norton was unable to win the support of many delegates. After a long and contentious series of roll call votes, Bryan won the Populist presidential nomination, taking 1042 votes to Norton's 321 votes.

Despite his earlier proclamation, Bryan accepted the Populist nomination. Facing a massive financial and organizational disadvantage, Bryan embarked on a campaign that took him across the country. He largely ignored major cities and the Northeast, instead focusing on the Midwest, which he hoped to win in conjunction with the Great Plains, the Far West, and the South. Watson, ostensibly Bryan's running mate, campaigned on a platform of "Straight Populism" and frequently attacked Sewall as an agent for "the banks and railroads." He delivered several speeches in Texas and the Midwest before returning to his home in Georgia for the remainder of the election.

Ultimately, McKinley won a decisive majority of the electoral vote and became the first presidential candidate to win a majority of the popular vote since the 1876 presidential election. Bryan swept the old Populist strongholds in the West and South, and added the silverite states in the West, but did poorly in the industrial heartland. His strength was largely based on the traditional Democratic vote, but he lost many German Catholics and members of the middle class. Historians believe his defeat was partly attributable to the tactics Bryan used; he had aggressively "run" for president, while traditional candidates would use "front porch campaigns." The united opposition of nearly all business leaders and most religious leaders also hurt his candidacy, as did his poor showing among Catholic groups who were alienated by Bryan's emphasis on Protestant moral values.

Collapse 

The Populist movement never recovered from the failure of 1896, and national fusion with the Democrats proved disastrous to the party. In the Midwest, the Populist Party essentially merged into the Democratic Party before the end of the 1890s. In the South, the National alliance with the Democrats sapped the Populists' ability to remain independent. Tennessee's Populist Party was demoralized by a diminishing membership, and puzzled and split by the dilemma of whether to fight the state-level enemy (the Democrats) or the national foe (the Republicans and Wall Street). By 1900 the People's Party of Tennessee was a shadow of what it once was. A similar pattern repeated throughout the South, where the Populist Party had previously sought alliances with the Republican Party against the dominant state Democrats, including in Watson's Georgia.

In North Carolina, the state Democratic Party orchestrated a propaganda campaign in newspapers across the state, and created a brutal and violent white supremacy election campaign to defeat the North Carolina Populists and GOP, the Fusionist revolt in North Carolina collapsed in 1898, and white Democrats returned to power. The gravity of the crisis was underscored by a major race riot in Wilmington in 1898, two days after the election. Knowing they had just retaken control of the state legislature, the Democrats were confident they could not be overcome. They attacked and overcame the Fusionists; mobs roamed the black neighborhoods, shooting, killing, burning buildings, and making a special target of the black newspaper. There were no further insurgencies in any Southern states involving a successful black coalition at the state level. By 1900, the gains of the populist-Republican coalition were reversed, and the Democrats ushered in disfranchisement: practically all blacks lost their vote, and the Populist-Republican alliance fell apart.

In 1900, many Populist voters supported Bryan again (though Marion Butler's home county of Sampson swung heavily to Republican McKinley in a backlash against the state Democratic party), but the weakened party nominated a separate ticket of Wharton Barker and Ignatius L. Donnelly, and disbanded afterward. The prosperity of the first decade of the 1900s helped ensure that the party continued to fade away. Populist activists retired from politics, joined a major party, or followed Debs into the Socialist Party.

In 1904, the party was reorganized, and Watson was its nominee for president in 1904 and 1908, after which the party disbanded again.

In A Preface to Politics, published in 1913, Walter Lippmann wrote, "As I write, a convention of the Populist Party has just taken place. Eight delegates attended the meeting, which was held in a parlor." This may record the last gasp of the party organization.

Legacy 
According to Gene Clanton's study of Kansas, populism and progressivism had a few similarities but different bases of support. Both opposed corruption and trusts. Populism emerged earlier and came out of the farm community. It was radically egalitarian in favor of the disadvantaged classes. It was weak in the towns and cities except in labor unions. Progressivism, on the other hand, was a later movement. It emerged after the 1890s from the urban business and professional communities. Most of its activists had opposed populism. It was elitist, and emphasized education and expertise. Its goals were to enhance efficiency, reduce waste, and enlarge the opportunities for upward social mobility. However, some former Populists changed their emphasis after 1900 and supported progressive reforms.

Debate by historians 

Since the 1890s historians have vigorously debated the nature of Populism. Some historians see the populists as forward-looking liberal reformers, others as reactionaries trying to recapture an idyllic and utopian past. For some they were radicals out to restructure American life, and for others they were economically hard-pressed agrarians seeking government relief. Much recent scholarship emphasizes Populism's debt to early American republicanism. Clanton (1991) stresses that Populism was "the last significant expression of an old radical tradition that derived from Enlightenment sources that had been filtered through a political tradition that bore the distinct imprint of Jeffersonian, Jacksonian, and Lincolnian democracy." This tradition emphasized human rights over the cash nexus of the Gilded Age's dominant ideology.

Frederick Jackson Turner and a succession of western historians depicted the Populists as responding to the closure of the frontier. Turner wrote:

 The Farmers' Alliance and the Populist demand for government ownership of the railroad is a phase of the same effort of the pioneer farmer, on his latest frontier. The proposals have taken increasing proportions in each region of Western Advance. Taken as a whole, Populism is a manifestation of the old pioneer ideals of the native American, with the added element of increasing readiness to utilize the national government to effect its ends.

The most influential Turner student of Populism was John D. Hicks, who emphasized economic pragmatism over ideals, presenting Populism as interest group politics, with have-nots demanding their fair share of America's wealth which was being leeched off by nonproductive speculators. Hicks emphasized the drought that ruined so many Kansas farmers, but also pointed to financial manipulations, deflation in prices caused by the gold standard, high interest rates, mortgage foreclosures, and high railroad rates. Corruption accounted for such outrages and Populists presented popular control of government as the solution, a point that later students of republicanism emphasized. In the 1930s, C. Vann Woodward stressed the southern base, seeing the possibility of a black-and-white coalition of poor against the overbearing rich.

In the 1950s, scholars such as Richard Hofstadter portrayed the Populist movement as an irrational response of backward-looking farmers to the challenges of modernity. Though Hofstadter wrote that the Populists were the "first modern political movement of practical importance in the United States to insist that the federal government had some responsibility for the common weal", he criticized the movement as anti-Semitic, conspiracy-minded, nativist, and grievance-based. According to Hofstadter, the antithesis of anti-modern Populism was the modernizing nature of Progressivism. Hofstadter noted that leading progressives like Theodore Roosevelt, Robert La Follette Sr., George Norris and Woodrow Wilson were vehement enemies of Populism, though Bryan cooperated with them and accepted the Populist nomination in 1896. Reichley (1992) sees the Populist Party primarily as a reaction to the decline of the political hegemony of white Protestant farmers; the share of farmers in the workforce had fallen from about 70% in the early 1830s to about 33% in the 1890s. Reichley argues that, while the Populist Party was founded in reaction to economic hardship, by the mid-1890s it was "reacting not simply against the money power but against the whole world of cities and alien customs and loose living they felt was challenging the agrarian way of life."

Goodwyn (1976) and Postel (2007) reject the notion that the Populists were traditionalistic and anti-modern. Rather, they argue, the Populists aggressively sought self-consciously progressive goals. Goodwyn criticizes Hofstadter's reliance on secondary sources to characterize the Populists, working instead with material generated by the Populists themselves. Goodwyn determines that the farmers' cooperatives gave rise to a Populist culture, and their efforts to free farmers from lien merchants revealed to them the political structure of the economy, which propelled them into politics. The Populists sought diffusion of scientific and technical knowledge, formed highly centralized organizations, launched large-scale incorporated businesses, and pressed for an array of state-centered reforms. Hundreds of thousands of women committed to Populism, seeking a more modern life, education, and employment in schools and offices. A large section of the labor movement looked to Populism for answers, forging a political coalition with farmers that gave impetus to the regulatory state. Progress, however, was also menacing and inhumane, Postel notes. White Populists embraced social-Darwinist notions of racial improvement, Chinese exclusion and separate-but-equal.

Influence on later movements 

Populist voters remained active in the electorate long after 1896, but historians continue to debate which party, if any, absorbed the largest share of them. In a case study of California Populists, historian Michael Magliari found that Populist voters influenced reform movements in California's Democratic Party and Socialist Party, but had a smaller impact on California's Republican Party. In 1990, historian William F. Holmes wrote, "an earlier generation of historians viewed Populism as the initiator of twentieth-century liberalism as manifested in Progressivism, but over the past two decades we have learned that fundamental differences separated the two movements." Most of the leading progressives (except Bryan) fiercely opposed Populism. Theodore Roosevelt, Norris, La Follette, William Allen White and Wilson all strongly opposed Populism. It is debated whether any Populist ideas made their way into the Democratic Party during the New Deal era. The New Deal farm programs were designed by experts (like Henry A. Wallace) who had nothing to do with Populism. Michael Kazin's The Populist Persuasion (1995) argues that Populism reflected a rhetorical style that manifested itself in spokesmen like Father Charles Coughlin in the 1930s and Governor George Wallace in the 1960s.

Long after the dissolution of the Populist Party, other third parties, including a People's Party founded in 1971 and a Populist Party founded in 1984, took on similar names. These parties were not directly related to the Populist Party.

Populism as a generic term 

In the United States, the term "populist" originally referred to the Populist Party and related left-wing movements of the late 19th century that wanted to curtail the power of the corporate and financial establishment. Later the term "populist" began to apply to any anti-establishment movement. The original generic definition of the term, which has held consistently since the emergence of its post-Populist Party genericness, describes a populist as "a believer in the rights, wisdom, or virtues of the common people." In the 21st century, the term once again began to be used. Politicians as diverse as independent left-wing Senator Bernie Sanders of Vermont and Republican President Donald Trump have been labeled populists.

Electoral history and elected officials

Presidential tickets

Seats in Congress

Governors                                                                                                              

 Colorado: Davis Hanson Waite, 1893–1895
 Idaho: Frank Steunenberg, 1897–1901 (fusion of Democrats and Populists)
 Kansas: Lorenzo D. Lewelling, 1893–1895
 Kansas: John W. Leedy, 1897–1899
 Nebraska: Silas A. Holcomb, 1895–1899 (fusion of Democrats and Populists)
 Nebraska: William A. Poynter, 1899–1901 (fusion of Democrats and Populists)
 North Carolina: Daniel Lindsay Russell, 1897–1901 (coalition of Republicans and Populists)
 Oregon: Sylvester Pennoyer, 1887–1895 (fusion of Democrats and Populists)
 South Dakota: Andrew E. Lee, 1897–1901
 Tennessee: John P. Buchanan, 1891–1893
 Washington: John Rogers, 1897–1901 (fusion of Democrats and Populists)

Members of Congress 

Approximately forty-five members of the party served in the U.S. Congress between 1891 and 1902. These included six United States Senators:

 William A. Peffer and William A. Harris from Kansas
 Marion Butler of North Carolina
 James H. Kyle from South Dakota
 Henry Heitfeld of Idaho
 William V. Allen from Nebraska

The following were Populist members of the U.S. House of Representatives:

52nd United States Congress

 Thomas E. Watson, Georgia's 10th congressional district
 Benjamin Hutchinson Clover, Kansas's 3rd congressional district
 John Grant Otis, Kansas's 4th congressional district
 John Davis, Kansas's 5th congressional district
 William Baker, Kansas's 6th congressional district
 Jerry Simpson, Kansas's 7th congressional district
 Kittel Halvorson, Minnesota's 5th congressional district
 William A. McKeighan, Nebraska's 2nd congressional district
 Omer Madison Kem, Nebraska's 3rd congressional district

53rd United States Congress

 Haldor Boen, Minnesota's 7th congressional district
 Marion Cannon, California's 6th congressional district
 Lafayette Pence, Colorado's 1st congressional district
 John Calhoun Bell, Colorado's 2nd congressional district
 Thomas Jefferson Hudson, Kansas's 3rd congressional district
 John Davis, Kansas' 5th congressional district
 William Baker, Kansas' 6th congressional district
 Jerry Simpson, Kansas' 7th congressional district
 William A. Harris, Kansas Member-at-large
 William A. McKeighan, Nebraska's 5th congressional district
 Omer Madison Kem, Nebraska's 6th congressional district
 Alonzo C. Shuford, North Carolina's 7th congressional district

54th United States Congress

 Albert Taylor Goodwyn, Alabama's 5th congressional district
 Milford W. Howard, Alabama's 7th congressional district
 William Baker, Kansas' 6th congressional district
 Omer Madison Kem, Nebraska's 6th congressional district
 Harry Skinner, North Carolina's 1st congressional district
 William F. Strowd, North Carolina's 4th congressional district
 Charles H. Martin (1848–1931), North Carolina's 6th congressional district
 Alonzo C. Shuford, North Carolina's 7th congressional district

55th United States Congress

 Albert Taylor Goodwyn, Alabama's 5th congressional district
 Charles A. Barlow, California's 6th congressional district
 Curtis H. Castle, California's 7th congressional district
 James Gunn, Idaho's 1st congressional district
 Mason Summers Peters, Kansas's 2nd congressional district
 Edwin Reed Ridgely, Kansas's 3rd congressional district
 William Davis Vincent, Kansas's 5th congressional district
 Nelson B. McCormick, Kansas's 6th congressional district
 Jerry Simpson, Kansas's 7th congressional district
 Jeremiah Dunham Botkin, Kansas Member-at-large
 Samuel Maxwell, Nebraska's 3rd congressional district
 William Ledyard Stark, Nebraska's 4th congressional district
 Roderick Dhu Sutherland, Nebraska's 5th congressional district
 William Laury Greene, Nebraska's 6th congressional district
 Harry Skinner, North Carolina's 1st congressional district
 John E. Fowler, North Carolina's 3rd congressional district
 William F. Strowd, North Carolina's 4th congressional district
 Charles H. Martin, North Carolina's 5th congressional district
 Alonzo C. Shuford, North Carolina's 7th congressional district
 John Edward Kelley, South Dakota's 1st congressional district
 Freeman T. Knowles, South Dakota's 2nd congressional district

56th United States Congress

 William Ledyard Stark, Nebraska's 4th congressional district
 Roderick Dhu Sutherland, Nebraska's 5th congressional district
 William Laury Greene, Nebraska's 6th congressional district
 John W. Atwater, North Carolina's 4th congressional district

57th United States Congress

 Thomas L. Glenn, Idaho's 1st congressional district
 Caldwell Edwards, Montana's 1st congressional district
 William Ledyard Stark, Nebraska's 4th congressional district
 William Neville, Nebraska's 6th congressional district

See also 

 Left-wing populism
 List of political parties in the United States
 Political interpretations of The Wonderful Wizard of Oz
 Bryant W. Bailey, Louisiana Populist
 Annie Le Porte Diggs (1853–1916), Populist advocate
 Leonard M. Landsborough, California Populist

Notes

References

Bibliography

Secondary sources 

 
 
 
 
 
 
 
 
 
 
 Hicks, John D. "The Sub-Treasury: A Forgotten Plan for the Relief of Agriculture". Mississippi Valley Historical Review, Vol. 15, No. 3 (Dec., 1928), pp. 355–373. in JSTOR.
 Hicks, John D. The Populist Revolt: A History of the Farmers' Alliance and the People's Party Minneapolis, MN: University of Minnesota Press, 1931.
 
 Hild, Matthew. Arkansas's Gilded Age: The Rise, Decline, and Legacy of Populism and Working-Class Protest (U of Missouri Press, 2018) online review
 
 
 
 
 
 Knoles, George Harmon. "Populism and Socialism, with Special Reference to the Election of 1892," Pacific Historical Review, vol. 12, no. 3 (Sept. 1943), pp. 295–304. In JSTOR
 Kuzminski, Adrian. Fixing the System: A History of Populism, Ancient & Modern. New York: Continuum Books, 2008.
 
 
 
 Miller, Worth Robert. "A Centennial Historiography of American Populism."  Kansas History 1993 16(1): 54–69. online edition
 Miller, Worth Robert. "Farmers and Third-Party Politics in Late Nineteenth Century America," in Charles W. Calhoun, ed. The Gilded Age: Essays on the Origins of Modern America (1995) online edition
 
 
 
 Peterson, James. "The Trade Unions and the Populist Party," Science & Society, vol. 8, no. 2 (Spring 1944), pp. 143–160. In JSTOR.
 
 
 
 
 
 
  online edition
 Woodward, C. Vann.  "Tom Watson and the Negro in Agrarian Politics," The Journal of Southern History, Vol. 4, No. 1 (Feb., 1938), pp. 14–33 in JSTOR

Contemporary accounts

External links 

 From People's Party Platform, Omaha Morning World-Herald, 5 July 1892
 40 original Populist cartoons, primary sources
 Peffer, William A. "The Mission of the Populist Party," The North American Review (Dec 1993) v. 157 #445 pp 665–679; full text online. important policy statement by leading Populist senator
 People's Party Hand-Book of Facts. Campaign of 1898 96 p., official party pamphlet for North Carolina election of 1898
 Populist, republican and Democratic cartoons, 189s election, primary sources
 Populist Party timeline and texts; edited by Professor Edwards, secondary and primary sources

Party publications and materials

 The People's Advocate (1892-1900), digitized copies of the Populist Party's newspaper in Washington State, from The Labor Press Project.
 Populist Cartoon Index. Archived at Missouri State University. Retrieved August 24, 2006.
 Buttons, tokens and ribbons of the Populist Party. Reprinted from Issue 19, Buttons and Ballots, Fall 1998. Retrieved August 26, 2006.
 People's Party Hand-Book of Facts. Campaign of 1898: Electronic Edition. Populist Party (N.C.). State Executive Committee. Reformated and reprinted by the University Library, The University of North Carolina at Chapel Hill.
 Populist materials online courtesy University Library, The University of North Carolina at Chapel Hill.

Secondary sources

 The Populist Movement in the United States by Anna Rochester, 1943.
 Farmers, the Populist Party, and Mississippi (1870-1900)]. By Kenneth G. McCarty. Published by [http://mshistory.k12.ms.us/index.html Mississippi History Now a project of the Mississippi Historical Society. Retrieved August 24, 2006.
 The Populist Party in Nebraska. Published by the Nebraskastudies.org, a project of the Nebraska Department of Education.
 Fusion Politics. The Populist Party in North Carolina. A project of the John Locke Foundation. Retrieved August 24, 2006.
 The Decline of the Cotton Farmer. Anecdotal account of rise and fall of Farmers Alliance and Populist Party in Texas.
 

 
Populism
Political parties established in 1887
Political parties disestablished in 1908
Progressive Era in the United States
Political parties in the United States
Radical parties
Defunct agrarian political parties
Left-wing populism in the United States